Monobutyl phthalate (MBP) is an organic compound with the condensed structural formula CH3(CH2)3OOCC6H4COOH.  It is a white solid that features both an butyl ester group and a carboxylic acid group. It is the major metabolite of dibutyl phthalate. Like many phthalates, MBP has attracted attention as a potential endocrine disruptor.

MBP is also the secondary metabolite of butyl benzyl phthalate, less than monobenzyl phthalate (MBzP).  It hydrolyses to phthalic acid and 1-butanol.

References

Phthalate esters
Endocrine disruptors